Guy Schmidt (born 12 April 1932) is a Luxembourgian footballer. He played in 14 matches for the Luxembourg national football team from 1952 to 1957.

References

External links
 

1932 births
Living people
Luxembourgian footballers
Luxembourg international footballers
Place of birth missing (living people)
Association footballers not categorized by position